University of Nevada, Las Vegas (UNLV) School of Dental Medicine is the dental school of the University of Nevada Las Vegas (UNLV). The school is located on the Shadow Lane Campus, located just east of University Medical Center of Southern Nevada on Charleston and Shadow Lane, in Las Vegas, Nevada. The school enrolls, on average, 80 freshmen per year.

See also

 American Student Dental Association

References

External links
 
Las Vegas Orthodontist | UNLV School of Medicine

2001 establishments in Nevada
Dental schools in Nevada
Educational institutions established in 2001
University of Nevada, Las Vegas